Emmanuel Lutheran Church may refer to:

 Emmanuel Lutheran Church (R M Lumsden, Saskatchewan)
 Emmanuel Lutheran Church (Dakota City, Nebraska)
 Emmanuel Lutheran Church (Lincolnton, North Carolina)
 Emmanuel Lutheran Church and Cemetery, Ralph, South Dakota
 Emmanuel Lutheran Church of Harlemville and Cemetery, New York

See also
 Emanuel Lutheran Church of Montra, Ohio
 Immanuel Lutheran Church (disambiguation)